Gomortega keule (syn. G. nitida; Spanish names keule, queule, and hualhual) is a tree native to Chile. It is the sole species of the genus Gomortega and, according to the APG IV system of 2016 (unchanged from the APG systems of 2009, 2003 and 1998), of the monotypic family Gomortegaceae, assigned to the order Laurales in the clade magnoliids.

Description

Evergreen trees, aromatic, gray bark with shallow longitudinal fissures. The leaves are petiolate, simple, entire, obovate to lanceolate, coriaceous. The stems have unilacunar nodes and with two foliar traces. The branches are quadrangular.

The edible fruit is a uni or trilocular yellow drupe, usually with 1 (-2) seeds, fleshy mesocarp, pleasant, stony endocarp. There are 1-2 seeds per fruit, with abundant, oily endosperm, large embryo, dicotyledonous.

The chromosome number is n = 21, 2n = 42.

Distribution

Gomortega keule grows only in a very narrow habitat range in coastal Central Chile, including the Maulino forest and parts of the Chilean matorral. It is a characterisc tree species of the Maulino forest alongside Nothofagus glauca, Nothofagus leonii and Nothofagus alessandri. 

The species is endangered of extinction due to overharvesting, clearing the forests where it is found for agriculture and silviculture.

See also
Beilschmiedia berteroana

References

External links

The species
Gomortega keule in Encyclopedia of the Chilean Flora
 Information on Gomortega keule (in Spanish)
  Listed as Endangered (EN A1cd v2.3)
 Pictures and habitat map of Gomortega keule (in Spanish)
 Project developed in Chile on Gomortega keule (in Spanish)
   (in Spanish)

The family
 Gomortegaceae  in L. Watson and M.J. Dallwitz (1992 onwards). The families of flowering plants : descriptions, illustrations, identification, information retrieval. Version: 27 April 2006. http://delta-intkey.com . 
 e-floras
 NCBI Taxonomy Browser
 links at CSDL, Texas

Monotypic Laurales genera
Chilean Matorral
Trees of Chile
Endangered plants
Taxa named by Henri Ernest Baillon
Taxa named by Juan Ignacio Molina